Hanane el-Fadili is a Moroccan actress and comedian. She was born on May 2, 1974 in Casablanca, Morocco. She specializes in parody, focusing on famous personalities and controversial figures. She addresses social and political issues relevant to Moroccan public opinion.

Personal life 
She's from a family of actors; her father is the actor Aziz el-Fadili and her brother is the producer Adil el-Fadili.

Career 
She has made a number of productions including programs such as Hanane Show and Super Hada, which were well received by Moroccan audiences. She also created Hanane Net, which was a series of short comedy videos produced by her brother Adil in 2017.

She produced Bnat Si Taher, which is another series that was aired on Ramadan of 2022. 

She was appointed UNICEF's goodwill ambassador to Morocco in 2010.

Shows 

 Bergaga
 SuperHadda
 Fatna Zerda

TV series 

 Hanane Show

References 

Moroccan actresses
Moroccan film actresses
Moroccan television actresses
Moroccan comedians
1974 births
Living people